Morgano is a comune (municipality) in the Province of Treviso in the Italian region Veneto, located about  northwest of Venice and about  west of Treviso.

Morgano borders the following municipalities: Istrana, Paese, Piombino Dese, Quinto di Treviso, Zero Branco.

References

External links
 Official website

Cities and towns in Veneto